The Flying Fox of Snowy Mountain is a Taiwanese television series adapted from Louis Cha's novels Fox Volant of the Snowy Mountain and The Young Flying Fox. The series was first broadcast on TTV in Taiwan in 1991.

Cast
 Meng Fei as Hu Fei / Hu Yidao
 Mimi Kung as Cheng Lingsu / Bing Xue'er (Mrs Hu)
 Wu Yujuan as Yuan Ziyi / Yuan Yingu
 Mu Sicheng as Miao Renfeng
 Tong Chun-chung as Tian Guinong
 Wang Luyao as Miao Ruolan
 Lü Ying-ying as Ma Chunhua
 Lin Wei as Fuk'anggan / Chen Jialuo
 Yuan Chia-pei as Nan Lan
 Wang Shang as Shang Baozhen
 Liang Pei-yu as Tian Qingwen
 Yu Yunhe as Cao Yunqi
 Wu Chiang-po as Tao Zi'an
 Chin Ying-chun as Xue He
 Kuan Yung as Ping Si
 Li Chieh as Li Zicheng
 Chang Shao-pin as Zhao Banshan
 Han Feng as Luo Bing
 Chao Kui as Taoist Wuchen
 Yang Hsuen as Hu / Murong Jingyue
 Fu Ke-li as Fan
 Kao Chen-peng as Wuzhen
 Ma Ching-yuen as Shi Wanshen
 Mu Huai-wei as Wu Sangui

Trivia
The ending song of the tv series refers to a Cantonese theme from A Moment of Romance.
It was first performed by Shirley Yuen, but the theme was only versionized by 2 female singers Fong Fei Fei & Sammi Kao.

External links

Taiwanese wuxia television series
Works based on Flying Fox of Snowy Mountain
Television series set in the Qing dynasty
1991 Taiwanese television series debuts
1990s Taiwanese television series
Television shows based on works by Jin Yong